The title Marchioness of Lothian is given to the wife of the Marquess of Lothian, and may refer to:

Harriet Lowry-Corry, Viscountess Belmore (1762–1805), wife of William Kerr, 6th Marquess of Lothian
Harriet Kerr, Marchioness of Lothian (1780–1833), second wife of the William Kerr, 6th Marquess of Lothian
Cecil Chetwynd Kerr, Marchioness of Lothian (1808–1877), British noblewoman, philanthropist, and wife of John Kerr, 7th Marquess of Lothian
Antonella Kerr, Marchioness of Lothian (1922–2007), British aristocrat, journalist, writer, and wife of Peter Kerr, 12th Marquess of Lothian
Jane Kerr, Marchioness of Lothian, wife of Michael Andrew Foster Jude Kerr, 13th Marquess of Lothian